The Employment Relations Act 2004 (c 24) is an Act of the Parliament of the United Kingdom which amended UK law regarding trade union membership and industrial action. The Act also enabled the UK government to make funds available to trade unions and federations of trade unions to modernise their operations.

Part 1

Section 21
This section inserts section 210A of the Trade Union and Labour Relations (Consolidation) Act 1992.

Section 24 - Inducement of members not accorded entitlement to vote
Section 24(2) was repealed by paragraph 21(c) of Schedule 4 to the Trade Union Act 2016.

Part 2

Section 28
Section 28(2) inserts section 238B of the Trade Union and Labour Relations (Consolidation) Act 1992.

Part 3

Section 29
This section inserts sections 145A to 145F of the Trade Union and Labour Relations (Consolidation) Act 1992.

Section 40
Section 40(1) inserts section 43M of the Employment Rights Act 1996. Section 40(3) inserts section 98B of the Employment Rights Act 1996.

Section 41 - Flexible working
Sections 41(1) and (2) are prospectively repealed by section 148 of, and Part 1 of Schedule 11 to, the Pensions Act 2008.

Section 42 - Information and consultation: Great Britain
The Information and Consultation of Employees Regulations 2004 (SI 2004/3426) were made under this section.

Section 42(5) is repealed by paragraph 6 of Schedule 1 to the Employment Rights (Amendment) (EU Exit) Regulations 2019 (SI 2019/535).

Section 43 - Information and consultation: Northern Ireland
Section 43(5) was repealed by paragraph 4(2) of the Employment Rights (Amendment) (Northern Ireland) (EU Exit) Regulations 2019 (SI 2019/537).

Part 4

Section 44
This section inserts section 16A of the National Minimum Wage Act 1998.

Sections 45 and 46
These sections were repealed on 6 April 2009 by section 20 of, and Part 2 of the Schedule to, the Employment Act 2008.

Section 46(1) inserted sections 22A to 22F of the National Minimum Wage Act 1998.

Section 47 - Enforcement officers for agricultural wages legislation
This section was repealed as to England on 1 October 2013 by section 72(4) of, and paragraph 2 of Schedule 20 to, the Enterprise and Regulatory Reform Act 2013.

Section 47(1) inserted section 11A of the Agricultural Wages Act 1948.

Part 5

Section 48
This section inserts section 256ZA of the Trade Union and Labour Relations (Consolidation) Act 1992.

Section 50
Section 50(2) inserts sections 101A and 101B of the Trade Union and Labour Relations (Consolidation) Act 1992.

Part 6

Section 55
Section 55(1) inserts section 116A of the Trade Union and Labour Relations (Consolidation) Act 1992.

Part 7

Section 57
Section 57(1) gives effect to Schedule 1. Section 57(2) gives effect to Schedule 2.

Section 58
The Employment Relations (Northern Ireland) Order 2004 (SI 2004/3078) (NI 19) was made under paragraph 1(1) of the Schedule to Northern Ireland Act 2000 as modified by section 58 of the Employment Relations Act 2004. The Order makes similar provision to the Employment Relations Act 2004, except sections 43 to 46, for Northern Ireland.

Section 59 - Citation, commencement and extent
The following orders have been made under this section:
The Employment Relations Act 2004 (Commencement No. 1 and Transitional Provisions) Order 2004 (S.I. 2004/2566 (C. 108))
The Employment Relations Act 2004 (Commencement No. 2 and Transitional Provisions) Order 2004 (S.I. 2004/3342 (C. 156))
The Employment Relations Act 2004 (Commencement No. 3 and Transitional Provisions) Order 2005 (S.I. 2005/872 (C. 36))
The Employment Relations Act 2004 (Commencement No. 4 and Transitional Provisions) Order 2005 (S.I. 2005/2419 (C. 100))

Schedule 1 -Minor and consequential amendments
Paragraph 1 was repealed by paragraph 2 of Schedule 20 to the Enterprise and Regulatory Reform Act 2013. Paragraph 14 was repealed by paragraph 21(c) of Schedule 4 to the Trade Union Act 2016.

Reception
According to the Trades Union Congress (TUC), the Act contains 'significant union victories'. The TUC's then general secretary, Brendan Barber welcomed the law, noting that "Staff will have to be given information and be consulted over major changes to the business, as they currently are in Britain’s best companies. Trade unions will be able to recruit members in an environment free of underhand, US-style union-busting activities and will find it easier the exclude and expel far-right activists in breach of union rules. The union modernisation fund the [Act] establishes will enable unions to modernise in the same way the government has helped businesses adapt to grow in the modern economy."

See also
Employment Relations Act

References
"Employment Relations Act 2004". Halsbury's Statutes of England and Wales. Fourth Edition Reissue. Volume 16. Title "Employment". 
"Employment Relations Act 2004". Current Law Statutes 2004. Sweet & Maxwell. London. W Green. Edinburgh. 2004. Volume 2. Chapter 24.
Smith and Baker. Smith & Wood's Employment Law. Eleventh Edition. Oxford University Press. 2013. Pages 10, 11, 629, 639, 642, 644, 648, 667, 668, 671, 692, 699, 700, 708, 735, 739, 740, 744 and 748.
Upex, Benny and Hardy. Employment Law. (Core Text Series). Third Edition. Oxford University Press. 2009. Paragraphs 12.1 to 12.4, 12.36, 13.19, 13.24 and 14.23 at pages 411 to 413, 423, 429, 435, 437, 451, and 460.
Honeyball & Bowers' Textbook on Employment Law. Thirteenth Edition. Oxford University Press. 2014. Pages 11, 122, 343, 404 and 441.
Emir (ed). Selwyn's Law of Employment. Seventeenth Edition. Oxford Unibersity Press. 2012. Paragraphs 21.49 and 23.48 at pages 598 and 649.
Deborah Lockton. Employment Law. (Cavendish Q&A series). Fourth Edition. Cavendish Publishing. 2006. Pages 16, 177, 179, 221 and 229.
Galbraith's Building and Land Management Law for Students. Sixth Edition. Butterworth-Heinemann. 2011. Page 226.

External links
The Employment Relations Act 2004, as amended from the National Archives.
The Employment Relations Act 2004, as originally enacted from the National Archives.
Explanatory notes to the Employment Relations Act 2004.

United Kingdom Acts of Parliament 2004
United Kingdom labour law
British trade unions history
Trade union legislation